The Embassy of Poland in Rome is the diplomatic mission of the Republic of Poland to the Italian Republic. The chancery is located at Via P.P.Rubens 20, Rome.

The Polish Embassy in Rome is located in a period building situated behind a protective wall just off Via P.P.Rubens. The embassy is protected by the Italian state police and the Carabinieri. It is open to both Polish citizens and citizens of the European Union for representation, protection and legal concerns, however it only deals with passport and consular business for Polish citizens and visa applicants (of all nations).

Since 2019 the ambassador of the Polish Republic to the Italian Republic is Anna Maria Anders. The Polish ambassador to Italy is also accredited to the Republic of San Marino.

See also
List of diplomatic missions of Poland
Foreign relations of Poland
Polish nationality law

References

External links
Embassy of Poland in Rome 

Poland
Rome
Italy–Poland relations